Albert Lee Kelley Jr. (February 9, 1935 – December 17, 2017) was an American professional golfer. Kelley played on the PGA Tour in the 1960s, and found success on the Senior PGA Tour (now PGA Tour Champions) over 20 years later. From 1988 to 1992, Kelley garnered 17 top-10 finishes, including a second-place finish at the 1990 Ameritech Senior Open and his sole win at the 1990 Newport Cup.

In 1988 and 1989, Kelley had to compete each week in the Monday qualifying rounds in order to gain entry to that week's Senior PGA tournament, earning one of the few qualifying spots available. Prior to his victory at Newport, he “earned the nickname ‘Mr. Monday’ for his ability to gain entry into tournaments via the open qualifier on Mondays.

Kelley won 18 titles before becoming a professional, including the Florida Amateur championship (1960, 1962) and the Air Force World Wide title (1962). In his first round as a professional at the 1962 Coral Gables Open, he led the tournament at the end of the first day, ultimately finishing 15th.

In addition to a successful career on the Senior PGA Tour and a limited run on the PGA Tour, Kelley served for as a club pro and teaching pro in positions throughout Central Florida. His head golf professional positions included stints at Mid-Florida, Dubsdread, Silver Lake Country Clubs, and Mount Dora County Club near Leesburg, Florida.

Kelley died December 17, 2017 at his home in Eustis, Florida.

Professional wins (1)

Senior PGA Tour wins (1)

References

External links

American male golfers
PGA Tour golfers
PGA Tour Champions golfers
People from Eustis, Florida
1935 births
2017 deaths